The La General Hospital is a hospital located in the La area of Accra, Ghana. It was formerly known as La Polyclinic.

La General Hospital was established to provide healthcare to the general public in and around Accra, the capital city of Ghana.

References 

Hospitals in Ghana